Wardle is a village in the Metropolitan Borough of Rochdale, Greater Manchester, England, and it is unparished. The village, together with the nearby settlement of Smallbridge and the surrounding countryside,  contains 27 listed buildings that are recorded in the National Heritage List for England.  All the listed buildings are designated at Grade II, the lowest of the three grades, which is applied to "buildings of national importance and special interest".  The area is largely rural and agricultural, although the textile industry came to the town as a result of the Industrial Revolution.  Included in the listed buildings are houses containing multi-light mullioned weavers' windows, and a mill.  Most of the listed buildings are houses and associated structures, farmhouses and farm buildings.  The other listed buildings include churches, a public house, a bridge and two war memorials.


Buildings

References

Citations

Sources

Lists of listed buildings in Greater Manchester
Buildings and structures in the Metropolitan Borough of Rochdale